Three ships have been named New Era:

 , launched in 1862, was a steamer used by the Union Navy during the American Civil War as a gunboat in support of the Union Navy blockade of Confederate waterways.
 , launched in 1856 as New Era, was an ironclad gunboat during the American Civil War. Before the United States Army upgraded and renamed her in 1861, she was a timberclad gunboat called USS New Era.
 New Era (1854 ship), launched and wrecked in 1854

See also
New Era (disambiguation)  – for other uses of New Era

New Era